Justin Paul Leone (born March 9, 1977) is an American former professional baseball third baseman. He is an alumnus of St. Martin's University.

Drafted by the Seattle Mariners in the 13th round of the 1999 Major League Baseball Draft, Leone made his Major League Baseball debut with the Seattle Mariners on July 2, . He spent the  season in the San Diego Padres organization, making the Triple-A All-Star team that year, in which he also participated in the home run derby. He was a part of the 2003 USA Olympic Qualifying Team.

In , Leone was named Texas League Player of the Year by Baseball America, Mariners Minor League Player of the Year by the Seattle organization and Texas League Player of the Year by Topps while playing for Double-A San Antonio. He started the season off the bench, but was picked to replace infielder Greg Dobbs after Dobbs went down with a season-ending injury.

Leone was the first Mariner to hit the KOMO Glove sign in left field during a game against the Cleveland Indians to earn a fan $1,000, it was also his first major league home run. He accomplished this two nights in a row.

From -, Leone played in the San Francisco Giants organization and became a free agent at the end of the 2008 season. In December 2008, he signed a minor league deal with the New York Yankees and was assigned to Triple-A Scranton. On July 31, 2009 Leone was released by the Yankees. On September 1,  Leone signed a Minor League contract with the Texas Rangers and was granted free agency on November 9, 2009.

External links

Justin Leone Minor League Stats and Splits

1977 births
Living people
Arizona League Giants players
Barstow Vikings baseball players
Baseball players from Nevada
Cardenales de Lara players
American expatriate baseball players in Venezuela
Everett AquaSox players
Fresno Grizzlies players
Major League Baseball third basemen
Oklahoma City RedHawks players
Sportspeople from Las Vegas
Portland Beavers players
Saint Martin's Saints baseball players
San Antonio Missions players
San Bernardino Stampede players
San Diego Padres players
Scranton/Wilkes-Barre Yankees players
Seattle Mariners players
Tacoma Rainiers players
Wisconsin Timber Rattlers players